Marin Lalić (born 30 November 1969) is a Croatian retired football midfielder and current manager of Bjelovar.

He had earlier replaced Mario Kos as Bjelovar's manager in April 2017.

References

External links
 

1969 births
Living people
People from Bjelovar
Association football midfielders
Yugoslav footballers
Croatian footballers
HNK Hajduk Split players
S.C. Salgueiros players
F.C. Paços de Ferreira players
HNK Suhopolje players
NK Zagreb players
NK Hrvatski Dragovoljac players
NK Inter Zaprešić players
NK Bjelovar players
Yugoslav First League players
Primeira Liga players
Croatian Football League players
First Football League (Croatia) players
Croatian expatriate footballers
Expatriate footballers in Portugal
Croatian expatriate sportspeople in Portugal
Croatian football managers